Sagan om ringen is a 1971 Swedish live action television film in two episodes. The film was inspired by the music album Music Inspired by Lord of the Rings by Bo Hansson, which in turn was inspired by J. R. R. Tolkien's 1954 novel The Lord of the Rings.

Live actors were filmed and inserted into hand drawn backgrounds.

Drawings were made by Peter Lindblom.

Plot 
The film covers quite faithfully the events of the first half of The Fellowship of the Ring, starting with Bilbo's birthday party and ending with the fellowship leaving Rivendell.

Unlike in Peter Jackson's adaptation, the journey of the hobbits to Bree includes their encounters with Old Man Willow and Tom Bombadil. Moreover, Glorfindel and his horse Asfaloth are depicted during the attack of the Black Riders. On the other hand, the character of Boromir is absent from Elrond's council.

References

External links 
 
First and second part of the film on YouTube

1971 television films
1971 films
Films based on The Lord of the Rings
Swedish television films
Films based on albums
1970s British films
1970s Swedish films